This is a continued list of Nintendo Switch games.

List
There are currently  games across List of Nintendo Switch games (0–9 and A), List of Nintendo Switch games (B), this page (C–G), List of Nintendo Switch games (H–P), and List of Nintendo Switch games (Q–Z).

References

Switch
Nintendo Switch